Viewers for Quality Television (also called "VQT") was an American nonprofit organization (under 501(c)(3)) founded in 1984 to advocate network television series that members of the organization voted to be of the "highest quality."  The group's goal was to rescue "...critically acclaimed programs from cancellation despite their Nielsen program rating." It was a participatory organization that was open to all interested viewers.  The organization was dissolved in late 2000 due to financial problems.

History
The group's founder Dorothy Swanson started VQT to save the television show Cagney and Lacey from cancellation. The VQT presented an award each year called the "Q" Award, based on the votes of its members. Actors were nominated based on the group's judgement of the "quality" of the acting. Other programs supported by the group included St. Elsewhere, Designing Women, Frank's Place, Quantum Leap, Sports Night, and Party of Five.

Aftermath
Swanson dissolved VQT in 2000 after the organization's membership dropped to 1,000 members (down from a peak of 5,000 members), which reduced the funding for the organization. With the low membership and lack of funding, VQT was not able to put on its annual "Q" awards ceremony in Los Angeles. Swanson claims that she disbanded the organization to avoid the danger of "... the organization becom[ing] a shadow of its former self, whether under my direction or somebody else's."

They became the subject of the 2018 documentary United We Fan.

List of Q Awards winners

Best Quality Drama Series:
 1985: Cagney & Lacey
 1986: Cagney & Lacey
 1987: Cagney & Lacey
 1988: Cagney & Lacey
 1989: China Beach
 1990: China Beach
 1991: China Beach
 1992: I'll Fly Away
 1993: I'll Fly Away
 1994: NYPD Blue
 1995: Picket Fences
 1996: Homicide: Life on the Street
 1997: ER
 1998: The Practice
 1999: The Practice
 2000: The West Wing

Best Quality Comedy Series:
 1985: The Cosby Show
 1986: The Cosby Show
 1987: Designing Women
 1988: Designing Women
 1989: Designing Women
 1990: Designing Women
 1991: Murphy Brown
 1992: Brooklyn Bridge
 1993: Brooklyn Bridge
 1994: Mad About You
 1995: Frasier
 1996: Frasier
 1997: Frasier
 1998: Ally McBeal
 1999: Everybody Loves Raymond
 2000: Everybody Loves Raymond

Best Actor in a Quality Drama Series:
 1985: Daniel J. Travanti – Hill Street Blues
 1986: William Daniels – St. Elsewhere
 1987: William Daniels – St. Elsewhere
 1988: Ron Perlman – Beauty and the Beast
 1989: Ron Perlman – Beauty and the Beast
 1990: Scott Bakula – Quantum Leap
 1991: Scott Bakula – Quantum Leap
 1992: Scott Bakula – Quantum Leap
 1993: Scott Bakula – Quantum Leap
 1994: Dennis Franz – NYPD Blue
 1995: Andre Braugher – Homicide: Life on the Street
 1996: Dennis Franz – NYPD Blue
 1997: Dennis Franz – NYPD Blue
 1998: Dennis Franz – NYPD Blue
 1999: Dennis Franz – NYPD Blue
 2000: Martin Sheen – The West Wing

Best Actor in a Quality Comedy Series:
 1985: Bill Cosby – The Cosby Show
 1986: Bill Cosby – The Cosby Show
 1987: Michael J. Fox – Family Ties / Bob Newhart – Newhart
 1988: Tim Reid – Frank's Place
 1989: Fred Savage – The Wonder Years
 1990: Fred Savage – The Wonder Years
 1991: Burt Reynolds – Evening Shade
 1992: John Goodman – Roseanne
 1993: Jerry Seinfeld – Seinfeld
 1994: Paul Reiser – Mad About You
 1995: Kelsey Grammer – Frasier
 1996: Kelsey Grammer – Frasier
 1997: Kelsey Grammer – Frasier
 1998: Kelsey Grammer – Frasier
 1999: Ray Romano – Everybody Loves Raymond
 2000: Ray Romano – Everybody Loves Raymond

Best Actress in a Quality Drama Series:
 1985: Sharon Gless – Cagney & Lacey
 1986: Sharon Gless – Cagney & Lacey
 1987: Sharon Gless – Cagney & Lacey
 1988: Sharon Gless – Cagney & Lacey
 1989: Dana Delany – China Beach
 1990: Dana Delany – China Beach
 1991: Dana Delany – China Beach
 1992: Regina Taylor – I'll Fly Away
 1993: Regina Taylor – I'll Fly Away
 1994: Kathy Baker – Picket Fences
 1995: Kathy Baker – Picket Fences
 1996: Sherry Stringfield – ER
 1997: Julianna Margulies – ER
 1998: Gillian Anderson – The X-Files
 1999: Gillian Anderson – The X-Files
 2000: Sela Ward – Once and Again
 2001: Allison Janney – The West Wing

Best Actress in a Quality Comedy Series:
 1985: Shelley Long – Cheers
 1986: Shelley Long – Cheers
 1987: Betty White – The Golden Girls
 1988: Betty White – The Golden Girls
 1989: Candice Bergen – Murphy Brown
 1990: Candice Bergen – Murphy Brown
 1991: Candice Bergen – Murphy Brown
 1992: Marion Ross – Brooklyn Bridge
 1993: Marion Ross – Brooklyn Bridge
 1994: Helen Hunt – Mad About You
 1995: Brett Butler – Grace Under Fire
 1996: Helen Hunt – Mad About You
 1997: Helen Hunt – Mad About You
 1998: Calista Flockhart – Ally McBeal
 1999: Patricia Heaton – Everybody Loves Raymond
 2000: Patricia Heaton – Everybody Loves Raymond

Best Supporting Actor in a Quality Drama Series:
 1985: Bruce Weitz – Hill Street Blues
 1986: John Karlen – Cagney & Lacey
 1987: John Karlen – Cagney & Lacey
 1988: Larry Drake – L.A. Law
 1989: Larry Drake – L.A. Law
 1990: Jimmy Smits – L.A. Law
 1991: Dean Stockwell – Quantum Leap
 1992: John Cullum – Northern Exposure
 1993: Chad Lowe – Life Goes On
 1994: Fyvush Finkel – Picket Fences
 1995: Peter MacNicol – Chicago Hope
 1996: Stanley Tucci – Murder One
 1997: Noah Wyle – ER
 1998: Steve Harris – The Practice
 1999: Steve Harris – The Practice
 2000: John Spencer – The West Wing

Best Supporting Actor in a Quality Comedy Series:
 1985: Nicholas Colasanto – Cheers
 1986: Michael J. Fox – Family Ties
 1987: Peter Scolari – Newhart
 1988: Meshach Taylor – Designing Women
 1989: Meshach Taylor – Designing Women
 1990: Meshach Taylor – Designing Women
 1991: Michael Jeter – Evening Shade
 1992: Michael Jeter – Evening Shade
 1993: Michael Jeter – Evening Shade
 1994: David Hyde Pierce – Frasier
 1995: David Hyde Pierce – Frasier
 1996: David Hyde Pierce – Frasier
 1997: David Hyde Pierce – Frasier
 1998: David Hyde Pierce – Frasier
 1999: Peter MacNicol – Ally McBeal
 2000: David Hyde Pierce – Frasier

Best Supporting Actress in a Quality Drama Series:
 1985: Veronica Hamel – Hill Street Blues
 1986: Betty Thomas – Hill Street Blues
 1987: Bonnie Bartlett – St. Elsewhere
 1988: Susan Ruttan – L.A. Law
 1989: Marg Helgenberger – China Beach
 1990: Marg Helgenberger – China Beach
 1991: Marg Helgenberger – China Beach
 1992: Kellie Martin – Life Goes On
 1993: Kay Lenz – Reasonable Doubts
 1994: Lauren Holly – Picket Fences
 1995: Julianna Margulies – ER
 1996: Barbara Bosson – Murder One
 1997: Gloria Reuben – ER
 1998: Gloria Reuben – ER
 1999: Camryn Manheim – The Practice
 2000: Tyne Daly – Judging Amy

Best Supporting Actress in a Quality Comedy Series:
 1985: Rhea Perlman – Cheers
 1986: Julia Duffy – Newhart
 1987: Julia Duffy – Newhart
 1988: Julia Duffy – Newhart
 1989: Park Overall – Empty Nest
 1990: Park Overall – Empty Nest
 1991: Park Overall – Empty Nest
 1992: Julia Louis-Dreyfus – Seinfeld
 1993: Julia Louis-Dreyfus – Seinfeld
 1994: Julia Louis-Dreyfus – Seinfeld
 1995: Jane Leeves – Frasier
 1996: Christine Baranski – Cybill
 1997: Julia Louis-Dreyfus – Seinfeld
 1998: Doris Roberts – Everybody Loves Raymond
 1999: Doris Roberts – Everybody Loves Raymond
 2000: Doris Roberts – Everybody Loves Raymond

Best Recurring Player:
 1991: Alice Ghostley – Designing Women
 1992: Adam Arkin – Northern Exposure
 1993: Ray Walston – Picket Fences
 1994: Scott Bakula – Murphy Brown
 1995: Kathleen Wilhoite – ER
 1996: Amy Aquino – Picket Fences
 1997: Pruitt Taylor Vince – Murder One
 1998: John Larroquette – The Practice

Founder's Award:
 1988: Ray Sharkey – Wiseguy
 1989: Terence Knox – Tour of Duty
 1990: Kenneth Johnson – Alien Nation
 1991: Robert Picardo – China Beach
 1992: Life Goes On
 1993: Homefront
 1994: South Central
 1995: Homicide: Life on the Street
 1996: Bonnie Hunt – Bonnie
 1997: Paul Haggis – EZ Streets
 1998: Nothing Sacred
 1999: Will & Grace
 2000: Buffy the Vampire Slayer

Network Commitment to Quality Award:
 1996: NBC
 1997: NBC
 1998: Fox

See also
Quality television – a term used by television scholars, television critics, and broadcasting advocacy groups to describe a genre or style of television programming that they subjectively argue is of higher quality, due to its subject matter or content.
Peabody Awards

Further reading
Dorothy Swanson.  The Story of Viewers for Quality Television: Grassroots to Prime Time (Syracuse University Press, 2000).

References

External links
Q Awards at IMDb.com

Television organizations in the United States
Defunct non-profit organizations based in the United States
501(c)(3) organizations
1984 establishments in the United States
2000 disestablishments in the United States